Charming Billy, a novel by American author Alice McDermott, tells the story of Billy Lynch and his lifelong struggle with alcohol after the death of his first love. It won the National Book Award for fiction as well as the American Book Award, and was shortlisted for the International Dublin IMPAC Literary Award. The novel was published by FSG in 1997 and has since been republished by Picador (as a Picador Modern Classic).

References

1997 novels
Farrar, Straus and Giroux books
National Book Award for Fiction winning works
Novels set in New York (state)